Ghita Nørby (born 11 January 1935) is a Danish actress with 117 film credits to her name from 1956 to 2005, making her one of the most active Danish actresses ever.

Early life
Nørby was born in Copenhagen, Denmark, the daughter of opera singer Einar Nørby (1896–1983). She studied two years at the Danish Royal Theatre (Det Kongelige Teater).

Career
She was an actress at the theatre from 1956 to 1959.

She has received a number of awards and recognitions including the Ingenio et Arti medal in 2006. At the 27th Guldbagge Awards she was nominated for the award for Best Actress for her role in Freud's Leaving Home.

Personal life
She has been married a number of times. First in 1956 to architect Mogens Garth-Grüner, and then to actor Henrik Wiehe. She met her next husband, Italian pop singer/actor Dario Campeotto, on the set of a film they were shooting in 1962. They were married in 1963, and had a son, actor Giacomo Campeotto, in 1964. They were divorced in 1969. She married a fourth time to actor Jørgen Reenberg in April 1970. She is currently married to pianist/composer, Svend Skipper.

Selected filmography
 Charles' tante (Charles' Aunt, International English title) (1959), role of Laura Hornemann
 Frihedens pris (1960), role of Lis
 Baronessen fra benzintanken (The Baroness from the Gas Station) 1960, role of Anne Tofte/von Rosensten
 Han, Hun, Dirch og Dario 1962
 Oskar 1962
 Den kære familie 1962
 Sytten 1965
 I Am Looking for a Man 1966
 Sangen om den Røde Rubin 1970
 Amour 1970
 Matador (Monopoly) 1978, TV series, role of Ingeborg Skjern
 Me and Charly 1978
 Katinka 1988
 Dansen med Regitze (Memories of a Marriage, Waltzing Regitze) 1989
 Den goda viljan (The Best Intentions'), 1992
 Riget (The Kingdom, International title) 1994–97, TV series
 Hamsun (1996)
 Edderkoppen (The Spider) (2000), TV series
 Rejseholdet (Unit 1, International English title) 2000, TV series
 Hjælp, Jeg er en Fisk (Help! I'm a Fish!) 2000, voice of Aunt Anna, the Eel
 Fire høytider (Four Festivals) 2000, TV mini-series
 Grev Axel (Count Axel): 2001, role of Baronesse Gjerløv
 En kort, en lang (Shake It All About, International English title) 2001
 Kokken (The Cook): (2002)
 Arsenik og gamle kniplinger (Arsenic and Old Lace) 2002, TV, role of Abby Brewster.
 Arven (The Inheritance, European English title) (2003)
 Ørnen: En krimi-odyssé (The Eagle: A Crime Odyssey) (2004), TV series
 O' Horten (2007)
 Maria Larssons eviga ögonblick (2008)
 Jauja (2014)
 Silent Heart (2014)
 Key House Mirror (2015)

She has additionally provided Danish voice to the following Disney animation films Pocahontas, Lady and the Tramp II, Pocahontas II: Journey to a New World, Mulan, The Emperor's New Groove, and Mulan II''.

Awards
 2006: Ibsen Centennial Commemoration Award

References

External links

1935 births
Danish actresses
Danish voice actresses
Living people
Actresses from Copenhagen
European Film Awards winners (people)
Recipients of Ingenio et Arti
Best Actress Guldbagge Award winners
Best Supporting Actress Guldbagge Award winners
Best Actress Bodil Award winners
Bodil Honorary Award recipients
Best Actress Robert Award winners